A cathole or cat hole or sometimes pighole is a pit for human feces.  Catholes are frequently used for the purpose of disposing of bowel movements or waste water (such as the water from cleaning the kitchen dishes) by hikers and others engaging in outdoor recreation. 

According to the Leave No Trace Center for Outdoor Ethics, catholes should be dug at least  from water sources, walking trails or campsites. Additionally, the same cathole should not be used twice. The digging of catholes is forbidden in some regions of high elevation where the climate can hinder the decomposition of waste.

See also
Pit toilet
Trowel
Hudo (scouting)

References

External links
Sanitation - instructions from Olympic National Park.

Toilets
Hiking
Defecation